In diplomacy, a  (Latin: "person not welcome",) is a status applied by a host country to foreign diplomats to remove their protection of diplomatic immunity from arrest and other types of prosecution.

Diplomacy
Under Article 9 of the Vienna Convention on Diplomatic Relations, a receiving state may "at any time and without having to explain its decision" declare any member of a diplomatic staff . A person so declared is considered unacceptable and is usually recalled to his or her home nation. If not recalled, the receiving state "may refuse to recognize the person concerned as a member of the mission". A person can be declared  before that person even enters the country.

With the protection of mission staff from prosecution for violating civil and criminal laws, depending on rank, under Articles 41 and 42 of the Vienna Convention, they are bound to respect national laws and regulations. Breaches of these articles can lead to a  declaration being used to punish erring staff. It is also used to expel diplomats suspected of espionage, described as "activities incompatible with diplomatic status", or any overt criminal act such as drug trafficking. The declaration may also be a symbolic indication of displeasure.

So-called "tit for tat" exchanges have occurred (whereby countries involved in a dispute each expel the ambassador of the other country), notably during the Cold War. A notable occurrence outside of the Cold War was an exchange between the United States and Ecuador in 2011: the Ecuadorian government expelled the United States ambassador, as a result of diplomatic cables leaking (WikiLeaks); the United States responded by expelling the Ecuadorian ambassador.

Other usage
People other than diplomats can be declared  by a country.

In the Philippines, local legislatures of provinces, towns, and cities can declare certain people or groups, including non-diplomats and Filipino citizens, as persona non grata to express a negative sentiment toward the certain person through a non-binding resolution. This could be in response to the person breaking local ordinance or laws. This has also happened in Spain.

See also

 
 Exile
 Nonperson
 Outlaw
 Refugee

References

External links
 
 
 eDiplomat.com: Glossary of Diplomatic Terms
 Text of the Vienna Convention – PDF

Diplomacy
Latin legal terminology
Latin words and phrases
International law
Blacklisting